Bernard John Newcombe (28 February 1931 – March 1996) was a Welsh professional footballer who played in the Football League for Brentford and Fulham as an outside forward. He later returned to Fulham as a scout.

Club career

Fulham 
Newcombe was spotted playing youth football in Wales by former Fulham goalkeeper Ossie Evans, who recommended the young outside forward to his former club. Newcombe transferred to the Second Division club in 1947. By the time Newcombe made his professional debut in a 1–0 defeat to Burnley on the final day of the 1950–51 season, the Cottagers were members of the First Division. He was always on the fringes of the first team at Craven Cottage and left the club in April 1956, having made 23 appearances and scored three goals.

Margate (loan) 
Newcombe joined high-flying Kent League First Division club Margate on loan in January 1948 and made just one appearance during his spell.

Brentford 
In April 1956, Newcombe transferred to Third Division South club Brentford and played in the final three games of the 1955–56 season. He established himself in the team in the 1956–57 season, making 46 appearances and he was a regular again the following year. Newcombe's professional career was effectively ended by a broken collarbone suffered in a match versus Torquay United in April 1958. Brentford were forced to play the rest of the match with 10 men and the resulting 1–0 defeat saw the Bees finish as runners-up in the Third Division South and miss out on promotion to the Second Division. Newcombe made just one appearance during the 1958–59 season and departed the club at the end of the campaign. He made 89 appearances and scored eight goals during three years at Griffin Park.

Non-League football 
Newcombe ended his career with spells at Southern League clubs Guildford City and Sittingbourne.

Career statistics

References

1931 births
Footballers from Swansea
Welsh footballers
Brentford F.C. players
English Football League players
Fulham F.C. players
Margate F.C. players
Date of death missing
1996 deaths
Southern Football League players
Guildford City F.C. players
Sittingbourne F.C. players
Fulham F.C. non-playing staff
Association football outside forwards
Kent Football League (1894–1959) players